Seethanagaram is a mandal in Parvathipuram Manyam district of the Indian state of Andhra Pradesh.

Geography
Seethanagaram is a Mandal in Parvathipuram Manyam District of Andhra Pradesh, India. Seethanagaram Mandal Headquarters is Seethanagaram town . It belongs to Andhra region . It is located 15 km towards South from District headquarters Parvathipuram. 468 km from State capital Vijayawada towards west. It has an average elevation of 95 meters (314 feet).

Demography
Telugu is the Local Language here. Total population of Seethanagaram Mandal is 56,331 living in 13,619 Houses, Spread across total 56 villages and 35 panchayats . Males are 27,931 and Females are 28,400.

References 

Hamlets in Andhra Pradesh